The Testerian catechisms (Spanish: Catecismos testerianos) were religious documents that were used in the Christian evangelization of the Spanish American colony of New Spain. They explain Catholic doctrine through sequential images based on indigenous conventions used prior to the Conquest of Mexico and the introduction of the Latin alphabet to write the indigenous languages of Mesoamerica. These documents were an attempt at educational materials for Christians who were either not literate in Spanish, or unfamiliar with the aboriginal languages then spoken in the territory that is now Mexico. They were named after Jacobo of Testera, a Franciscan friar who elaborated catechisms of this type.

Context 
The missionaries who participated in the evangelization of the American continents looked for ways to transmit the new doctrine. Native Mesoamerican images and documents were subject to destruction, as they were considered idolatric materials, but were tolerated  when used in a Christian religious context. Theatrical performances, music, architecture, public sermons, and other types of media supported the new religious precepts. The Testerian catechisms were used to transmit the  Ten Commandments and  prayers like the Lord's Prayer and the Hail Mary.

References

External links 

 Full digital facsimiles of Testerian catechisms in the John Carter Brown Library's collection on Internet Archive
Catecismo pictórico Otomí

Colonial Mexico
16th century in Mexico
Roman Catholic missionaries in New Spain
Catechisms of the Catholic Church
Franciscans
Teaching
Mexican documents